Bekovo is an urban locality (a work settlement) and the administrative center of Bekovsky District of Penza Oblast, Russia, located to the extreme south of the oblast on the right bank of the Khopyor River,  from Penza. Population:

History

It was founded in the late 17th century and renamed in the 18th century after Alexander Bekovich-Cherkassky. The inhabitants built the church of St. Nicholas in 1771 and the Church of the Intercession in 1813. Urban-type settlement status was granted to Bekovo in 1959.

Transportation
It has a railway station on the Tambov-Saratov line, now belonging to the South-Eastern Railway, which opened on February 22, 1874.

References

Urban-type settlements in Penza Oblast
Serdobsky Uyezd